Turin Papyrus refers to any papyrus manuscript in the collection of the Museo Egizio (Egyptian Museum) at Turin, Italy. The best known of these manuscripts include:

 Turin King List
 Turin Papyrus Map
 Turin Erotic Papyrus
 Judicial Papyrus of Turin